Till Roenneberg (born 4 May 1953) is a professor of chronobiology at the Institute of Medical Psychology at Ludwig-Maximilian University (LMU) in Munich, Germany. Roenneberg, in collaboration with Martha Merrow, explores the impact of light on human circadian rhythms, focusing on aspects such as chronotypes and social jet lag in relation to health benefits.

Life 

Roenneberg was born in Munich, Germany. He began working with Jürgen Aschoff at the age of 17.

Roenneberg attended both the University College London and Ludwig Maximilian University of Munich where he began by studying physics. He switched to medicine in order to focus on the science of the human body, but ended up studying biology. As a postdoctoral fellow, he studied again under Jürgen Aschoff, studying annual rhythms in the body, then moved to the United States to study the cellular basis of biological clocks under Woody Hastings at Harvard University.

In 1991, he began the tradition of giving the Aschoff's Ruler prize to a chronobiologist who has advanced the field.

He is currently the vice-chair of the Institute for Medical Psychology of the Ludwig Maximilian University of Munich, the head of the Centre for Chronobiology, the president-elect of the European Biological Rhythms Society, the president of the World Federation of Societies for Chronobiology, and a member of the Senior Common Room of Brasenose College, University of Oxford. From 2005 to 2010 he was the coordinator of "EUCLOCK" and coordinator of the Daimler-Benz-Foundation network "ClockWORK", and from 2010 to 2012 was the member at large of the Society for Research of Biological Rhythms

Work

Early work

Dinoflagellates 
Aside from human chronobiology, Roenneberg has significantly contributed to other aspects of the chronobiology field. He has done extensive work on dinoflagellates, a unicellular organism, and has been able to show that even this simple organism is capable of possessing two independent rhythms, providing evidence that a single cell can have two different oscillators. In addition, his work on dinoflagellates has been able to show that these two independent oscillators differ to a significant extent in that they respond differently when treated with various light pulses. They found that the two oscillators have varying sensitivities to different types of light. The B-oscillator is most sensitive to blue light while the A oscillator is sensitive to both blue and red light.

Neurospora crassa 
Roenneberg has also completed work on Neurospora crassa, determining the masking qualities of entrainment through a Frequency (gene)-null circadian oscillator. He observed in the period of spore production (conidia bands) the phenomenon of masking, an unexpected effect on circadian entrainment due to a particular zeitgeber (such as light or temperature). Masking has significant implications not only for future studies – which must attempt to demask affected data – but also in relation to entrainment in everyday life.

Current work

Chronotype questionnaire 

One of Till Roenneberg's most renowned accomplishments is the development of the Munich Chronotype Questionnaire (MCTQ). As a collaboration with Martha Merrow at LMU Munchen, the MCTQ samples sleep and circadian rhythm data from more than 25,000 participants. Unlike other chronotyping methods, which address the psychology of sleep, the MCTQ measures the phase angle of entrainment, the difference between an organism's intrinsic circadian period and the environmental light cycle. Thus, this questionnaire is the first to use a biological foundation, rather than psychology to determine the basis of sleep schedules.

Questions about work day and free day sleep schedules, work details, and lifestyle provide data to aid in the understanding of the interplay of biological clocks and social influences. Such research has led Roenneberg to his theory of social jet lag. The MCTQ categorizes each participant into one of seven chronotype groups and utilizes data on participants’ midsleep phase and sleep debt to survey what “type” of sleeper each person is, such as late sleepers, slightly late sleepers, early sleepers, and others. From these data, the MCTQ offers methods to make up for sleep debt (if any), and offers suggestions on what to do to wake up earlier or sleep later.

This chronotype questionnaire is important because it delves into the social aspects of circadian rhythms. By testing behavior rather than directly testing genetic factors, the MCTQ may offer new information regarding how the effects of external factors, including geographic location, seasons, obesity, social jet lag, or shift work, may relate to genetic predispositions of circadian rhythms.

Internal time 
Roenneberg released a book in March 2012 titled Internal Time: Chronotypes, Social Jet Lag, and Why You're So Tired where he explains the concepts behind circadian rhythm to the masses. One of the major points in his book is, "Early birds and night owls are born, not made."   Roenneberg wanted to rid people of labels such as "lazy" that frequently get placed upon those who wake up late. With this book, he wanted to deliver his point that these sleep patterns are due to people's genetics and are not from choice. He discusses how everyone is born with an internal clock, and living a lifestyle in dissonance with this inherent biological clock puts individuals at greater risk for health problems. Roenneberg introduces the term “social jet lag," saying it is more dangerous than normal jet lag because social jet lag forces individuals to persistently go against their biological clock in a consistent light/dark cycle.  In this book, he defines social jet lag as “the difference between midsleep on free days and midsleep on work days." Free days are defined as days without an alarm clock, where one naturally wakes up, and work days where one wakes up with an alarm clock. Midsleep is defined as the midpoint of an individual's sleeping period. One of the significant health risks of social jet lag is obesity, and Roenneberg claims that for every hour of social jet lag, the probability of being overweight increases by approximately 33%. In fact, social jet lag is so prevalent that Roenneberg claims that 87% of the population of Central Europe suffers from social jet lag to some degree.

Roenneberg also claims that adolescents, biologically, have an internal clock that causes their midsleep to fall later than young infants and adults. Thus, teenagers are not lazy, but are simply following their internal rhythms by going to sleep later and waking up later. This late midsleep pattern changes after adolescence, but at different points for men and women. Women's midsleep changes around age eighteen, while men's midsleep changes at the age of twenty-one. Forcing teenagers to wake up early, against their internal rhythms, leads to stress. As many studies have shown, stress leads to unhealthy decisions such as smoking and drinking.

Awards 
 Harvard-Hoops Price for Excellence in Teaching
 Honma Prize for Outstanding Contributions to Chronobiological Research
 Silver Medal of the University of Munich
 Professional Lighting Design Recognition Award for Research and Education

Selected publications 
Some of Roenneberg's publications include:

References

External links 
 MCTQ Chronotype Questionnaire
 "Internal Time" by Till Roenneberg

 LMU-Munich Website
 European Biological Rhythms Society
 EUCLOCK
 Society for Research on Biological Rhythms

20th-century German biologists
Chronobiologists
Academic staff of the Ludwig Maximilian University of Munich
Harvard University alumni
Living people
1953 births
Alumni of University College London
Scientists from Munich
21st-century German biologists